Plicothrips is a genus of thrips in the family Phlaeothripidae.

Species
 Plicothrips apicalis
 Plicothrips cameroni

References

Phlaeothripidae
Thrips
Thrips genera